Chippenham Rugby Football Club is an English rugby union club located in Chippenham, Wiltshire. Chippenham has three senior teams, supported by a full set of mini and junior sides. The first team currently play in Regional 2 Severn, a level six league in the English rugby union league system, while the second and third teams play in Dorset & Wilts 1 North and Dorset & Wilts 3 North respectively (level 8 and 10).

Honours
1st team:
Berks/Dorset/Wilts 2 champions: 1987–88
Southern Counties South champions: 1998–99
South West 2 (east v west) promotion play-off winners: 2004–05
South West 1 East champions (2): 2007–08, 2014–15
Tribute South West Division 1 West champions: 2010–11

2nd team:
Dorset & Wilts 1 North champions (2): 2011–12, 2012–13

External links
 

Chippenham
English rugby union teams
Rugby clubs established in 1898
1898 establishments in England
Rugby union in Wiltshire